Teudelinda (7th-century – fl. 702) was a Duchess consort of Asti by marriage to king Ansprand.

She and her son and daughter were taken capture by Aripert II after the defeat of her spouse, and had her nose and ears mutilated because of her ambition to become queen. It is not known if she was still alive when her spouse became king in 712, so it is not known if she actually became queen.

References 

8th-century Italian women
7th-century births
8th-century deaths